Pachygaster pulcher is a species of soldier fly in the family Stratiomyidae. The range of this species includes the Canadian province of Ontario.

References

Further reading

 

Stratiomyidae
Articles created by Qbugbot
Insects described in 1863

Insects of Canada
Diptera of North America